Kurds in Germany are residents or citizens of Germany of full or partial Kurdish origin. There is a large Kurdish community in Germany. The number of Kurds living in Germany is unknown. Many estimates assume that the number is in the million range.

Immigration history
In Germany, Kurdish immigrant workers from Turkey first arrived in the second half of the 1960s. They immigrated to Germany as "Gastarbeiter" (guest workers). Since the 1970s and especially since the 1980s, the number of Kurds in Germany has increased rapidly. Reasons for migration include the better living standards and jobs in Germany, and the political unrest, discrimination, persecution, and war in their home countries.

Since the beginning of the Syrian Civil War in 2011, many of the Syrian refugees who have come to Germany are Kurds.

Cities

German Kurds live spread throughout Germany, especially in cities with a large proportion of Turkish people. Examples are Berlin, Hamburg, Munich, Frankfurt, Stuttgart and Essen.

Political representation
There have been several politicians in German political parties with a Kurdish origin and who also openly demand a embetterment of the situation for the Kurds. Prominent names are the Members of the Bundestag Gökay Akbulut, Evrim Sommer or Sevim Dagdelen, all members of the Die Linke. Muhterem Aras of the Green Party is the president of the State legislature of Baden-Württemberg.

Political activism 

In 2014, Kurds in Germany marched in protest over the Islamic State of Iraq and the Levant's siege of Kobani.

In 2015, thousands of Kurds in Germany marched against Turkish Air Force air strikes on Kurdish civilians.

In October 2019, thousands of German Kurds protested against the 2019 Turkish offensive into north-eastern Syria.

Gangs 
According to the German authorities tin 2013. The Swiss newspapers Blick and Neue Zürcher Zeitung claimed that the Kurdish gang/motorcycle club "Sondame", allegedly "fighting" for a free Kurdistan, was formed in Stuttgart, and in 2015, it had about 1,000 members in Germany and Switzerland. The group is not well known and its existence is controversial. Other Kurdish motorcycle club and gangs include Median Empire and Red Legion.

Women's rights

Some cases of honour killing have been reported among the Kurdish diaspora in Germany. In March 2009, a Kurdish immigrant from Turkey, Gülsüm S., was killed for a relationship not in keeping with her family's plan for an arranged marriage. In 2016 a Kurdish woman was shot dead at her wedding in Hannover after refusing to marry her cousin.

Notable people
See List of German people of Kurdish descent

See also
Yazidis in Germany
Honor killing of Hatun Sürücü

References

 
German people of Kurdish descent
Middle Eastern diaspora in Germany
Muslim communities in Europe